The United Methodist Church in Liberia is a member of the United Methodist Church, one of the world’s largest  denominations. It is part of the Wesleyan Tradition, a methodical faith and practice started by John Wesley, whose father was a priest in the Anglican Church in England. The church today is found in almost all parts of the world including Europe, Asia, USA, and Africa. Liberia in Africa,  is one of the many African countries where the United Methodist Church  is established.

History
The United Methodist Church  in Liberia started in 1821. It was started by free blacks and formerly enslaved persons who had returned to Africa from the United States of America. Among its early members was Joseph Jenkins Roberts, who served as the first president of Liberia. It was organized as the Annual Conference of the United Methodist Church based in the Liberia Area. An Annual Conference  is a primary unit through which the church Is established in a certain area.  It is the denominational representation of the church where all power and voice can be found. Thus, the Liberia Annual Conference, United Methodist Church came into existence one hundred and eighty one years ago and can count on a long experience of faithful service to the Liberian people.

Composition
The Liberia Annual Conference, the United Methodist Church consist of 20  Districts. A District is smaller than an Annual Conference and contain anywhere from 10 to 40 churches depending on where it is situated. Thus, the 20  Districts that make up the Liberia Annual Conference can be found geographically all parts of Liberia with concentration in west, central and south-eastern Liberia. In total, the Liberia Annual Conference has about five hundred local churches that make up the conference.

Districts of the Liberia Annual Conference
The 20  Districts of the Annual Conference include:
Monrovia District
St. Paul River District
Kakata- Farminton River District
Weala District
St. John River District
Grand Bassa District
 Rivercess District
Gbarnga District
Jorquelleh District
Lofa River District
Gompa District
Cape Palmas District
Garraway District
 Kru Coast District
Nana Kru District
Barrabo District
Sinoe District
Morweh District
Tappita District
 Kokoyah District

Ministries of the Liberia Annual Conference
The Liberia Annual Conference, United Methodist Church operates from a central office from which the work of the church is coordinated all across Liberia. There are about twenty five different ministries or departments through which the church reaches out to God’s people. They are as follows:
Agriculture
Judith Craig Children Village
Christian Education Department
Communications Department
Conference Course of Study Department
Youth and Young Adults Department
Women Ministries
Men Ministries
Children Ministries
Evangelism Department
Health and Welfare Department
Education and General Ministries Department
Board of Laity
Operation Classrooms
Hope for the Deaf
Guinea Ministries
Board Of Trustee
Finance Department

See also
Conferences of the United Methodist Church
Central Conferences (United Methodist Church)
College of West Africa

References
Official Website

Methodism in Liberia
Liberia
1830s establishments in Liberia
Religious organizations established in 1833